Saskatoon is the largest city in Saskatchewan, and thus is home to many sports teams across a variety of sports.

Baseball

Basketball

Football

Hockey

University

Others

References